is a city in Osaka Prefecture, Japan. It is located in northern Osaka's Hokusetsu region.

As of 2020, the city had an estimated population of 347,944 and a population density of 3,300 persons per km². The total area is 105.31 km².

The city was founded on January 1, 1943, and is situated almost directly between Kyoto and Osaka. Owing to the convenience of being 13 and 15 minutes by train from these two cities respectively, the city prospered and has developed with increasing rapidity to become one of the biggest commuter towns in the area, serving both Kyoto and Osaka. Culturally, Takatsuki is  renowned for its Imashirozuka Kofun (burial mound). Earthenware funerary objects (haniwa) discovered around this mound include figurines of warriors almost certainly placed with a protective purpose (The form of such a warrior was used as the design basis for the city's official mascot character, Hanitan). Takatsuki is also known for its Takatsuki Jazz Festival, held every year in Golden Week . This is a two-day extravaganza of live jazz featuring over 300 acts, involving over 3,000 artists, who perform in 72 different locations in and around the central business district.

Neighboring municipalities
Osaka Prefecture
Shimamoto
Hirakata
Neyagawa
Settsu
Ibaraki
Kyoto Prefecture
Nishikyō-ku, Kyoto
Kameoka

Points of interest
Settsu-kyo Valley Natural Park
Kosobe Conservatory (Kyoto University)
Kansai University Takatsuki campus, Takatsuki Muse campus
Osaka Medical College
Heian Jogakuin University Takatsuki campus
Hankyu
Matsuzakaya
Mizuho Bank
Imashirozuka kofun
Akutagawayama Castle
Takatsuki Catholic Church
, a public park in Takatsuki.
Ama ruins
Kyodai Seminar
Yaotomi
Green Plaza
Actamore
Muse Takatsuki

Transportation

Railways
West Japan Railway Company
JR Kyoto Line: Settsu-Tonda Station – Takatsuki Station
Hankyu Railway
Kyoto Line: Tonda Station – Takatsuki-shi Station – Kammaki Station

Takatsuki-shi is served by two railway companies: JR (Japan Railway Company) and Hankyu. Many people prefer JR, owing to lower fares and slightly more frequent service. After an accident on the JR Fukuchiyama Line caused 108 casualties in 2005, there was an increase in Hankyu's passenger share but this has since been reversed. As Takatsuki is one of Osaka's larger suburban cities, almost every train stops there.

The Sakaisuji Line terminates at Takatsuki-shi Station, while some trains come from Kyoto-kawaramachi Station.

Buses
Takatsuki has its own municipal bus network and private carriers, such as Keihan Bus and Hankyu Bus, also operate there.

Highways

Sister and Friendship cities
  Masuda, Shimane, Japan – Sister city agreement concluded in 1971 (with former Hikimi town)
  Wakasa, Mikatakaminaka District, Fukui, Japan – Sister city agreement concluded in 1993 (with former Mikata town)
  Manila, Philippines – Sister city agreement concluded in 1979
  Changzhou, Jiangsu, China – Sister city agreement concluded in 1987
  Toowoomba, Queensland, Australia – Sister city agreement concluded in 1991

Notable people from Takatsuki
Haru Kuroki, Japanese actress
Hidemasa Morita, Japanese footballer 
Masaaki Higashiguchi, Japanese footballer
Nobunari Oda, Japanese competitive figure skater
Shingo Murakami, Japanese singer, presenter, variety tarento and actor (Kanjani Eight)
Shinji Nakano, Japanese professional racing driver 
Shu Kurata, Japanese footballer 
Tatsunosuke Takasaki, Japanese businessman-politician
Toshio Irie, Japanese swimmer
Yūko Sano, Japanese volleyball player

References

External links

 Takatsuki City official website 
 Takatsuki official website 

 
Cities in Osaka Prefecture